Ndougou is a department of Ogooué-Maritime Province in western Gabon. The capital lies at Gamba. It had a population of 11,092 in 2013.

References

Ogooué-Maritime Province
Departments of Gabon